Elio Gasperoni (born 22 May 1943) is a Sammarinese sports shooter. He competed at the 1980 Summer Olympics and the 1984 Summer Olympics.

References

1943 births
Living people
Sammarinese male sport shooters
Olympic shooters of San Marino
Shooters at the 1980 Summer Olympics
Shooters at the 1984 Summer Olympics
Place of birth missing (living people)